Argyrotaenia montezumae is a species of moth of the family Tortricidae. It is found in Guatemala, Mexico and the United States, where it has been recorded from Arizona and New Mexico.

The wingspan is 16–20 mm. The ground color of the forewings is ocherous with pale orange-ocherous markings. The hindwings are shining white. Adults have been recorded on wing in July and August.

The larvae feed on Eupatorium species, Parthenium hysterophorus, Persea americana, Lilium longiflorum var. eximium and Gossypium herbaceum.

References

M
Moths of Central America
Moths of North America
Moths described in 1914